Phil Pavlov (born May 26, 1963) is a former Republican member of the Michigan Senate, representing the 25th district (Huron, Sanilac, and St. Clair counties and the northeast corner of Macomb County) from 2011 until 2018. He previously served three terms in the House of Representatives, and, for one term, was a member of the St. Clair County Board of Commissioners.

He lost the Republican primary election to Paul Mitchell.

References

1963 births
Living people
People from Port Huron, Michigan
County commissioners in Michigan
Republican Party members of the Michigan House of Representatives
Republican Party Michigan state senators
21st-century American politicians